Blue Light 'til Dawn is a studio album by American jazz singer Cassandra Wilson. Her first album on the Blue Note label, it was released in 1993. It contains Wilson's interpretations of songs by various blues and rock artists, as well as three original compositions. The album marked a shift in Wilson's recording style, mostly dropping the electric instruments of her earlier albums in favor of acoustic arrangements. A critical and commercial breakthrough, the album was re-released in 2014 with three bonus tracks recorded live somewhere in Europe during the Blue Light 'til Dawn Tour. The eponymous single was nominated for the Grammy Award as Best Jazz Vocal Performance.

Background
As of March 1996, the album sold over 250 000 copies. While recording the album, Wilson's father, jazz bassist Herman Fowlkes, died. In an interview for New York Magazine Wilson explained that the album's name refers to a certain time of night. Says Wilson "At a party you have a blue light to have a certain vibe. The title refers to that light, that blue, giving way to the dawn. It's after after hours, the predawn twilight".

Reception
Rolling Stone reviewer John Milward gave the album three and a half stars out of five. He praised Wilson's choice of blues tracks by Robert Johnson and guitarist Brandon Ross' arrangements. He also liked Wilson's title track, but was less fond of her interpretations of Joni Mitchell's "Black Crow" or Ann Peebles' "I Can't Stand the Rain". Ron Wynn of Allmusic gave the album a rating of five stars out of five. In contrast to Milward, he enjoyed Wilson's "piercing version" of "I Can't Stand the Rain".  The Buffalo News review by Jeff Simon noted, "When the disc is good... it makes the disc hard to get off your turntable. It's erratic, though, with some of her headstrong notions panning out less well than others. At its best, though, it's sublime."

Track listing
 "You Don't Know What Love Is" (Gene DePaul, Don Raye) — 6:05
 "Come on in My Kitchen" (Robert Johnson) — 4:53
 "Tell Me You'll Wait for Me" (Charles Brown, Oscar Moore) — 4:48
 "Children of the Night" (Thom Bell, Linda Creed) — 5:19
 "Hellhound on My Trail" (Johnson) — 4:34
 "Black Crow" (Joni Mitchell) — 4:38
 "Sankofa" (Cassandra Wilson) — 2:02
 "Estrellas" (Cyro Baptista) — 1:59
 "Redbone" (Wilson) — 5:35
 "Tupelo Honey" (Van Morrison) — 5:36
 "Blue Light 'til Dawn" (Wilson) — 5:09
 "I Can't Stand the Rain" (Don Bryant, Bernard Miller, Ann Peebles) — 5:27
 "Black Crow" (Joni Mitchell) — 6:30
 "Skylark"  (Johnny Mercer, Hoagy Carmichael) — 8:40
 "Tupelo Honey" (Van Morrison) — 7:13
Songs 13–15 are bonus tracks of the 2014 re-issue.

Personnel
 Cassandra Wilson – vocals
 Olu Dara – cornet
 Don Byron – clarinet
 Charlie Burnham – violin, mandocello
 Tony Cedras – accordion
 Gib Wharton – pedal steel guitar
 Chris Whitley – resophonic guitar
 Brandon Ross – acoustic guitar
 Kenny Davis – bass
 Lonnie Plaxico – bass
 Lance Carter – drums, percussion
 Bill McClellan – drums, percussion
 Cyro Baptista – percussion
 Jeff Haynes – percussion
 Kevin Johnson – percussion
 Vinx – percussion

Chart performance

References

1993 albums
Cassandra Wilson albums
Blue Note Records albums
Albums produced by Craig Street